Prayad Marksaeng (born 30 January 1966) is a Thai professional golfer.

Career
Prayad was a member of Thailand's winning golf team at the 1987 South East Asian Games and turned professional in 1991. He has been a member of the Asian Tour since it began in its modern form in 1995. He has won seven events on the tour, becoming one of the first ten men to reach a million U.S. dollars in career earnings. He has also competed on the Japan Golf Tour and in 2008 won three tournaments in Japan.

Prayad represented Thailand at the 2007 and 2008 Omega Mission Hills World Cup and has been featured in the top 50 of the Official World Golf Ranking.

Prayad received a special invitation to play in the 2008 Masters Tournament. Marksaeng shot an 82 (+10) in the first round and withdrew midway through the second round due to a back injury.

At the age of 50, Prayad won the SMBC Singapore Open by one stroke over Phachara Khongwatmai, Jbe' Kruger, Juvic Pagunsan and Song Young-han. This event was co-sanctioned by the Japan Golf Tour and the Asian Tour. This win also guaranteed him a place in the 2017 Open Championship.

Professional wins (52)

Japan Golf Tour wins (6)

1Co-sanctioned by the OneAsia Tour
2Co-sanctioned by the Asian Tour

Japan Golf Tour playoff record (0–1)

Asian Tour wins (10)

1Co-sanctioned by the Japan Golf Tour

Asian Tour playoff record (1–0)

All Thailand Golf Tour wins (18)
2000 Singha Masters
2004 Singha Masters
2005 Singha Pattaya Open
2007 B-Ing TPC Championships, Singha E-San Open1
2008 Singha Masters
2009 Singha Championship
2010 Singha Classic
2012 Singha Masters
2013 Singha E-San Open1, Road To Panasonic Open Singha Bangkok Open
2014 Singha Pattaya Open1, Singha All Thailand Grand Final
2015 Singha Pattaya Open1, Singha Chiang Mai Open1, Singha Masters
2016 Singha Hua Hin Open1, Singha Chiang Mai Open
1Co-sanctioned by the ASEAN PGA Tour

ASEAN PGA Tour wins (6)

1Co-sanctioned by the All Thailand Golf Tour

Thailand PGA Tour wins (1)

Japan PGA Senior Tour wins (18)
2016 Maruhan Cup Taiheiyo Club Senior, Komatsu Open, Japan Senior Open, Japan PGA Senior Championship
2017 Sumida Cup Senior Golf Tournament, Starts Senior Golf Tournament, Japan Senior Open (2), Fujifilm Senior Championship
2018 Fubon Yeangder Senior Cup, Starts Senior Golf Tournament (2), Japan Senior Open (3), Maruhan Cup Taiheiyo Club Senior (2), Fancl Classic
2019 Fancl Classic (2), Maruhan Cup Taiheiyo Club Senior (3)
2022 Japan Senior Open Golf Championship (4), Japan PGA Senior Championship (2), Trust Group Cup Sasebo Senior Open Golf Tournament

Results in major championships

Note: Marksaeng never played in the U.S. Open.

CUT = missed the half-way cut
WD  = withdrew
"T" = tied

Results in World Golf Championships

QF, R16, R32, R64 = Round in which player lost in match play
"T" = Tied
Note that the HSBC Champions did not become a WGC event until 2009.

Team appearances
Dynasty Cup (representing Asia): 2003 (winners), 2005 (winners)
World Cup (representing Thailand): 1994, 2007, 2008, 2009, 2013
Royal Trophy (representing Asia): 2009 (winners), 2010
EurAsia Cup (representing Asia): 2014, 2016
Amata Friendship Cup (representing Thailand): 2018 (winners)

See also
List of golfers with most Asian Tour wins

References

External links

Prayad Marksaeng
Asian Tour golfers
Japan Golf Tour golfers
1966 births
Living people